The 169th Infantry Regiment was an infantry regiment of the United States Army, Connecticut National Guard. They trace their ancestry back to when militia units in the Connecticut colony organized for drill in 1672, but their official organization as the 1st Connecticut occurred on 11 October 1739. Since then, the 169th and its predecessor units have fought in numerous American wars until its deactivation in 1992.

History

Early history 
The 169th Infantry Regiment traces its heritage back to when militia units in Hartford County, Connecticut organized into the Regiment of Hartford County in 1672. The militia regiment did much to keep the peace with the nearby Pequot Indians, and on 11 October 1739, the militia was organized into the First Connecticut Regiment, the officially recognized birthday of the 169th Infantry. During the French and Indian War, the 1st Connecticut was called up on 7–8 August 1757 for a period of two weeks to man fortifications. Volunteers from Hartford, Simsbury, and Windsor were enlisted, and it is unknown whether these militiamen saw action in combat.

American Revolutionary War 
In the summer of 1776, General George Washington called upon the state militias to meet the British Empire's suspected attack on New York. The 1st Regiment of the Connecticut militia responded, and they reported for duty on 11 August 1776. The militia troops were hastily assembled, poorly armed, meagerly paid, thus discipline and morale was low. On 15 September 1776, they were attacked by the British Army and retreated in the face of superior firepower. The 1st Connecticut militia was ordered to reinforce General Horatio Gates at Saratoga in the fall of 1777 and served under the command of General Enoch Poor. The Connecticuters fought heavily at the Battle of Freeman's Farm on 19 September 1777, and at the Battle of Bemis Heights on 7 October. At Bemis Heights, they lost more men than any other regiment engaged, and General Gates referred to them as the "excellent militia regiment from Connecticut.

War of 1812 
On 28 April 1812, Governor Roger Griswold ordered the mobilization of 3,000 militiamen to repel any British invasion during the War of 1812. The 1st Regiment consisted of 121 officers and men and began their service on 7 June 1813 when they marched to New London. On 28 July 1814, the Connecticut militia deployed along the coast from Stonington to Greenwich to deter an enemy invasion. The 1st contributed 522 officers and men for the task, and were relieved on 27 October 1814.

American Civil War and Spanish–American War 
On 15 April 1861, President Abraham Lincoln issued a call for volunteers after the fall of Fort Sumter, and the 1st Connecticut Volunteer Infantry Regiment was mustered in on 22–23 April. A Company was designated as a "Rifle Company," and B and C Companies were designated as "Infantry Companies. The regiment arrived at Washington D.C. on 13 May, and camped at Glenwood, 2 miles to the north of the capitol. On 1 June, the 1st Connecticut relieved the 12th New York Volunteer Infantry and engaged in their first engagement of the Civil War at Vienna, Virginia, where they were ambushed by Confederate troops, and PVT George H. Bugbee of A Company was wounded; the regiment's first casualty of the war. The regiment fought in the First Battle of Bull Run on 21 July, where they engaged in constant activity against the enemy, and repelled infantry and cavalry attacks from 1,000 to 1,600. The 1st Connecticut remained in Washington until 27 July, and were mustered out in New Haven, Connecticut on 31 July 1861 when their period of enlistment expired. Parts of the regiment remained in service with the 4th Connecticut Infantry Regiment and the 7th Connecticut Infantry Regiment.

The 1st Connecticut Infantry was recalled to federal service on 26 April 1898 for duty in the Spanish–American War. They were destined to invade the island of Puerto Rico, but they never saw active service and were mustered out on 31 October 1898.

Mexican border 
The 1st Connecticut was called up on 18 June 1916 by President Woodrow Wilson, and the 1,100 officers and men of the regiment assembled at Camp Holcomb in Niantic and departed for the Mexico–United States border, arriving in El Paso, Texas on 2 July. On 7 July, the Connecticuters began patrolling near Nogales, Arizona. For 13 weeks, the regiment patrolled the border and encountered slight enemy resistance during their time there but suffered no casualties. They continued their training at Fort Huachuca on 24 August before returning to Nogales in September and continuing patrols in conjunction with the 2nd Connecticut, soon to be the 102nd Infantry Regiment.

World War I and Organization 
When the United States began their involvement in First World War, the 1st Connecticut donated many men to the newly formed 102nd Infantry Regiment, but the new US infantry regiment claimed its heritage from the 2nd Connecticut Infantry Regiment. Once the Great War had ended and the Connecticut soldiers returned home in April 1919, Congress passed the National Defense Act of 1920, and the 169th Infantry regiment was officially born. From 23 December 1920 to 23 June 1923, the new 169th Infantry expanded until it possessed 15 company sized units, a medical detachment, a band, and three Headquarters detachments. A and D Companies were recruited from Meriden, B Company was recruited from Middletown, and C Company was recruited from Bristol. E, F, G, and H Companies were all recruited from Hartford. I and M Companies hailed from New Britain, K Company came from Manchester, and L Company was recruited from Willimantic.

World War II 
The 169th Infantry Regiment was ordered to mobilize on 24 February 1941 and join the 43rd Infantry Division, the "Winged Victory" Division. The regiment moved to Camp Blanding, Florida and upon induction, consisted of 132 officers and 1,825 enlisted men. Under the command of COL Kenneth F. Cramer, the 169th trained hard for 13 weeks, and from 17 to 28 June, the regiment received 950 draftees to fill their ranks. The 169th trained in the states of Florida, Louisiana, North Carolina, and South Carolina until 4 December. At this time, the count was 90 officers, 1 warrant officer, and 2,219 enlisted men. The Attack on Pearl Harbor on 7 December 1941 marked the entry of the United States in the Second World War. On 11 December 1941, 22 officers and 700 enlisted men of the 169th were transferred to the 102nd Regiment, who were detached from the 43rd Infantry Division. At Camp Shelby, Mississippi, the 169th received 900 new recruits on 21 February 1942 and began training them right away. Another 900 raw recruits were received on 22 May 1942. On 30 September 1942, the 169th Infantry Regiment left San Francisco, California and sailed to New Zealand with a total strength of 139 officers, 5 warrant officers, and 3,138 enlisted men.

The regiment arrived in New Zealand on 22 October, and engaged in intensive training on the island until 22 November 1942. On 28 November, the 169th arrived in Nouméa, New Caledonia and garrisoned the island while conducting intensive jungle warfare training, loading and unloading ships, and guarding Japanese prisoners of war. The 169th embarked for Guadalcanal on 15 February 1943, and two days into the voyage, the convoy was attacked by Japanese torpedo planes. On 18 February, the convoy docked at Guadalcanal and bivouacked on the island. On 23–24 February, the 1st and 2nd Battalions of the 169th made an amphibious assault on the island of Pavuvu in the Russell Islands against no resistance. The regiment's first casualties came during their occupation of Pavuvu when Japanese planes strafed their positions. 3rd Battalion arrived on Pavuvu on 27 March. For the next few months, the 169th conducted jungle warfare training on the island and honed their battle skills before their next assignment.

New Georgia 

Operation "Toenails," or the Invasion of New Georgia, would be the next mission the 169th would undertake. As a part of the 43rd Infantry Division operation, the Regiment seized Rendova Island against minimal opposition on 30 June. Elements of the 169th soon landed on the southern coast of New Georgia on 2 July and began to march alongside the 172nd Infantry Regiment toward Munda Point to capture the Munda Airfield there. The men of the regiment "were soon introduced to the harsh realities of jungle warfare." The main attack was scheduled to begin on 9 July 1943, but the 169th (unaccustomed to combat) was exhausted after spending a sleepless night shooting at real and imagined enemy patrols. The drive resumed on 11 July, but was completely stalled by combat casualties, fatigue, jungle diseases, and continuous rain. Static warfare in the dense jungle made the drive on Munda Point bitter and frustrating for the men of the 169th. By 17 July, the main line of Japanese resistance had not been reached, but the regiment had already suffered 90 men killed and 600 men wounded along with many psychoneurotic casualties. By on 18 July, the Japanese attempted to drive the 1st Battalion (1-169) off of "Kelley Hill," but the Connecticuters killed 102 of their enemy and drove them back. After heavy fighting along the line, the airfield was finally captured after heavy loss on 5 August 1943. From 6–10 August, the beleaguered regiment guarded Munda Airfield and were subjected to minor enemy air attacks. 3rd Battalion (3-169) was ordered to seize the island of Baanga northwest west of Munda Point and met heavy resistance and elements were soon pinned down on the beaches and in the dense jungle. 2-169 landed on Baanga to reinforce the attack, but the Japanese resistance on the islands was much stronger than anticipated and the advance made slow, if any, progress. On 20 August they were relieved by elements of the 172nd Infantry Regiment. This "non-battle" on Baanga had cost the Americans 44 dead and 74 wounded; L Company was reduced to just 16 men. From 25 August to 9 September, the regiment patrolled and guarded Munda Airfield until they were ordered to assist the 172nd Infantry in clearing Arundel Island which they managed to secure on 21 August. Here they suffered 4 killed and 29 wounded. The regiment moved back to Munda, and defended the airstrip until 19 January 1944, when 3-169 was ordered to Vella Lavella to defend the airstrip there. The regiment then arrived in New Zealand for R&R on 1 March. The men had free time, furloughs, awards ceremonies, training exercises, and parades while in New Zealand.

New Guinea 
The 169th Infantry Regiment arrived at Aitape, New Guinea on 17 July 1944, to reinforce General Walter Krueger's Sixth Army. The regiment was ordered to construct defensive lines in the area to support the 32nd Infantry Division already fighting in the area. Japanese patrols constantly harassed the men, and they launched a counterattack on 22 July. The 169th threw this charge back and inflicted 274 deaths on the enemy. Patrolling and encountering the enemy was commonplace in the Aitape region, and the men experienced hard fighting along the Drinuimor River and nearby ridges on 31 July. Hard fighting in the hills, jungles, and villages near Aitape continued until long after the area was officially declared secure on 25 August 1944. The regiment conducted continuous training after being relieved by the Australian 6th Division until 10 December 1944, when the regiment loaded up and headed for Luzon.

Luzon 
During the Battle of Luzon, the 169th was in charge of the left flank of the 43rd Infantry Division's advance. 2-169 landed near San Fabian on 9 January 1945 in Lingayen Gulf and advanced quickly inland. 1-169 and 3-169 followed shortly after and pressed the attack. The hills and rugged countryside of Luzon proved to be very difficult ground, and tenacious Japanese defenders made the drive painful. On 12 January, SSG Robert E. Laws (G Company, 2–169) earned the Medal of Honor for his actions while attacking an enemy controlled ridge. Neutralizing enemy pillboxes with grenades, he managed to knock it out despite being wounded. Leading a charge, he was wounded again and killed three Japanese soldiers in close combat. He was given first aid and evacuated from the area while his squad completed the destruction of the enemy position. SSG Laws' heroic actions provided great inspiration to his comrades, and his courageous determination, in the face of formidable odds and while suffering from multiple wounds, enabled them to secure an important objective with minimum casualties.

The 169th attacked numerous enemy positions, including the deadly Hill 355, and suffered many casualties, but eventually managed to take ground from the stalwart defenders. During the period of 15–21 January 1945, all three infantry battalions of the 169th Regiment earned the Distinguished Unit Citation award for their gallantry in action amid the rugged hills of Luzon. On 1–2 February, the regiment repulsed tenacious enemy Banzai charges and managed to capture the imposing Hill 1500 on 5 February, and were relieved on 14 February by elements of the 33rd Infantry Division and enjoyed some R&R behind the lines. In the early stages of the Battle of Luzon, the 169th lost 17 officers and 248 enlisted men KIA, and 45 officers and 789 enlisted men WIA. They had managed to inflict (by actual count) 2,786 Japanese dead.

On 1 March, the 169th relieved elements of the 40th Infantry Division near Clark Field and Fort Stotsenburg. The regiment was ordered to attack Hill 1750, but were thwarted by strong Japanese resistance until 6 March. The men then captured a nearby hill, Bald Hill, and held it against several enemy counterattacks on 9–10 March. During this period, the 169th Infantry Regiment was under the command of the 38th Infantry Division, and were returned to 43rd Divisional control on 24 March. On 3 April, they were attached to the 112th Cavalry Regiment to conduct reconnaissance against the formidable Shimbu Line. These recon patrols were costly, but they managed to contain the enemy in the area. On 1 May, they were returned to the 43rd Infantry Division. They then attacked the enemy in the vicinity of the Ipo Dam, which controlled roughly 30% of Manila's water supply. The dam was secured on 19 May, but resistance continued in the area until 2 June 1945. In this particular fight, the 169th suffered 60 KIA, 285 WIA, and 2 MIA, while the 43rd Infantry Division as a whole killed over 750 enemy combatants. On 5 June, the 169th relieved the 151st Infantry Regiment near Mount Oro. Nearby hills and ridges were secured against heavy enemy resistance, and the 169th continued to slog on through the island against determined defenders until 28 June 1945, when the 43rd Division was relieved by the 38th Division.

Occupation of Japan 
The 169th soon found themselves as part of the US Occupation of Japan, garrisoning Kumagaya Airdrome from 14 September – 12 October. They set sail for San Francisco separately, and the last men to return home passed under the Golden Gate Bridge on 29 October 1945 to a cheering crowd. During the war, all three battalions of the 169th earned the Distinguished Unit Citation, and the Philippine Republic Presidential Unit Citation. On 1 November 1945, the regiment was inactivated.

Post-World War II 
It was reactivated on 23 October 1946 to serve the Connecticut National Guard in Hartford, CT. During the Korean War, the 169th was called up for service to train in the event the war escalated. The regiment trained at Camp Pickett and Camp A. P. Hill, Virginia from October 1950 to October 1951 filling to full establishment before deployment by ship to Germany to prevent possible Soviet attack. The regiment was garrisoned first around Munich then around Nurnburg. It returned to Connecticut in 1954 continuing to serve the state of Connecticut until 1992, when the last remnants of the 169th Infantry Regiment were inactivated.

References 

169
169
Military units and formations established in 1672
Military units and formations disestablished in 1992